The canton of Coteaux du Lizon (before March 2020: canton of Saint-Lupicin) is an administrative division of the Jura department, eastern France. It was created at the French canton reorganisation which came into effect in March 2015. Its seat is in Coteaux du Lizon.

It consists of the following communes:
 
Bellecombe
Les Bouchoux
Chassal-Molinges
Choux
Coiserette
Coteaux du Lizon
Coyrière
Lajoux
Lamoura
Larrivoire
Lavancia-Épercy
Lavans-lès-Saint-Claude
Les Moussières
La Pesse
Rogna
Septmoncel Les Molunes
Vaux-lès-Saint-Claude
Villard-Saint-Sauveur
Viry
Vulvoz

References

Cantons of Jura (department)